KHEL-LP (97.3 FM, "The Flame") is a radio station licensed to serve Rogers, Arkansas.  The station is owned by New Covenant Church In America. It airs an Adult Hits music format.

The station was assigned the KHEL-LP call letters by the Federal Communications Commission on March 23, 2004.

References

External links
KHEL-LP official website
 
KHEL-LP service area per the FCC database

HEL-LP
Adult hits radio stations in the United States
HEL-LP
Benton County, Arkansas